The 2010 Guangzhou International Women's Open (also known as the Landsky Lighting Guangzhou International Women's Open for sponsorship reasons) was a tennis tournament on outdoor hard courts. It was the 7th edition of the Guangzhou International Women's Open, and part of the WTA International tournaments of the 2010 WTA Tour. It took place in Guangzhou, People's Republic of China, from September 13 through September 19, 2010.

WTA entrants

Seeds 

 1 Seeds are based on the rankings of August 30, 2010.

Other entrants 
The following players received wildcards into the singles main draw:
  Han Xinyun
  Lu Jing-jing
  Xu Yifan

The following players received entry from the qualifying draw:
  Hsieh Su-wei
  Kim So-jung
  Junri Namigata
  Sun Shengnan

Champions

Singles 

 Jarmila Groth def.  Alla Kudryavtseva 6–1, 6–4
 It was Jarmila's first title on the WTA Tour.

Doubles 

 Edina Gallovits /  Sania Mirza def.  Han Xinyun /  Liu Wanting, 7–5, 6–3

External links 
 

Guangzhou International Women's Open
2010
Guangzhou International Women's Open, 2010